The Euro Players Tour Championship 2010/2011 – Event 5 (also known as the  2010 Ruhr Championship) was a professional minor-ranking snooker tournament that took place between 12–14 November 2010 at the Sparkassen Arena in Hamm, Germany.

John Higgins won in the final 4–2 against Shaun Murphy.

Prize fund and ranking points
The breakdown of prize money and ranking points of the event is shown below:

1 Only professional players can earn ranking points.
2 Prize money earned from the Plate competition does not qualify for inclusion in the Order of Merit.

Main draw

Top half

Section 1

Section 2

Section 3

Section 4

Bottom half

Section 5

Section 6

Section 7

Section 8

Finals

Century breaks
 139, 135, 133  Joe Perry
 136  Paul Davison
 133, 129  Graeme Dott
 132, 107, 107, 101  John Higgins
 130, 105, 100  Shaun Murphy
 126  Adam Wicheard
 121  Rory McLeod
 120, 105  Mark Allen
 119, 102  Andy Hicks
 118, 107  Judd Trump
 118, 100  Anthony Hamilton
 113  Daniel Wells
 112  Mark Selby
 108, 103  Tom Ford
 108  Mark Davis
 107  Peter Ebdon
 107  Liu Song
 106, 103  Mark Williams
 106, 101  Stuart Bingham
 106  Marcus Campbell
 104  Stephen Lee
 104, 100  Dominic Dale
 103  Kurt Maflin
 100  Michael White

References

External links
Facebook: EPTC5 - Day 2
Facebook: ETPC5 - Day 3

5 Euro
2010 in German sport

sv:Euro Players Tour Championship 2010/2011#Euro Players Tour Championship 5